Deschampsia elongata is a species of grass known by the common name slender hairgrass.

Distribution
It is native to western North America from Alaska to Wyoming to northern Mexico, and South America in Chile. It grows at all elevations, often in moist areas.

Description
It is a perennial grass forming dense clumps sometimes exceeding a meter in height. Most of the leaves are located in a tuft about the base of the stems. The inflorescence is a thin row of V-shaped spikelets arranged parallel to and mostly flat against the stem.

References

External links

Jepson Manual Treatment
USDA Plants Profile
Grass Manual Treatment
Photo gallery

elongata
Bunchgrasses of North America
Native grasses of California
Grasses of Mexico
Grasses of the United States
Grasses of Canada
Flora of California
Plants described in 1840
Flora without expected TNC conservation status